Indonesian Ulema Council (abbreviated MUI) is Indonesia's top Islamic scholars body. MUI was founded in Jakarta on July 26, 1975 during the New Order era. The council comprises many Indonesian Muslim groups including Nahdlatul Ulama (NU), Muhammadiyah, and smaller groups such as, Syarikat Islam, Perti, Al Washliyah, Mathla'ul Anwar, GUPPI, PTDI, DMI and Al Ittihadiyyah. The Ahlul Bait Indonesia (Shi'ite) and Jemaat Ahmadiyyah Indonesia (Ahmadiyya) were not accepted as members. 

In 2005, MUI released the fatwa to prohibit Ahmadiyya as deviant sect of Islam and lobbied the President to ban the expelled religious sect. An important function of MUI is to provide halal certification for products (including but not limited to foods, cosmetics, pharmaceutical and clothing).

Roles

The government, at the creation of the MUI stated three broad goals for the MUI:
Strengthening religion in the way the Pancasila describes to ensure national resilience.
Participation of the Ulama in national development.
The maintenance of harmony between the different religions in Indonesia.

Beside the three goals, nonetheless, there were two specific agendas of MUI's establishment. First, it aimed to help Suharto in communism repudiation. Second, it was an umbrella organization for political Islam canalization.

Since the collapse of Suharto's regime in 1998, MUI has changed its approach in the state-religion relationship by envisioning a more active role to protect Muslim's interests while started a new position as a critical partner of the Indonesian government. The MUI, thus, acts as an interface between the Indonesian government and the Islamic communities. The changes in civil society after the fall of Suharto have both widened the role of the MUI and made it more complex. 
The MUI gives fatwas to the Islamic community; through this they dictate the general direction of Islamic life in Indonesia. Fatwa (or plural form Fatawa) represents Muslim's ethical response, legal interpretation, and contextual feedback on a particular social issue(s). 

The MUI now has twelve commissions and ten divisions that work together in behalf of Muslim's interest through various responsibilities such as fatwa, education and leadership training, women and family, law and regulation, research and development, inter-religious engagement, international relations, economic betterment and many more. Each commissions is led by professional and Islamic scholars.

The MUI (particularly since the fall of Suharto) have given opinion and issued fatwas on a large variety of issues, from the role of the Indonesian Army in government to the public acceptability of the dancing of pop star Inul Daratista to the (sin of) deliberately burning forests to clear the land for growing crops.

In 2019 presidential election, the sitting MUI leader Ma'ruf Amin was elected as the vice president of Joko Widodo.

List of Chairman
 Abdul Malik Karim Abdullah (1975-1981)
 Syukri Ghozali (1981-1984)
 Hasan Basri (1984-1990)
 Ali Yafie (1990-2000)
 Sahal Mahfudz (2000-2014)
 Din Syamsuddin (2014-2015)
 Ma'ruf Amin (2015-2020)
 Miftachul Akhyar (2020-2022)
 Muhammad Cholil Nafis (2022-present)

Conflicts

MUI is a government funded organisation that acts independently but there have been examples of the MUI being asked to legitimise government policy. A particular example of this that caused friction within the MUI was request that the MUI support the government's birth control program. The government needed the support of the MUI and aspects of the program were objected to by many in religious circles.

See also
Halal certification in Australia

References

External links
MUI official website 
MUI official website 

Islamic organizations based in Indonesia